Rashid Al Oraifi (1942 – March 19, 2017 in Riffa. Bahrain) was a Bahraini plastic artist.

Career

Al Oraifi participated in his first art exhibition on December 13, 1963. He was represented in a 1966 Arab art show, and in 1967 he became the first Bahraini artist to host his own exhibition in the country at the Al-Orouba SC. He founded the Bahrain Contemporary Art Association in 1970, serving as its first president. In 1972, he became the first local to win the country's top public art prize. He participated in the 1973 Al-Wasiti Festival in Baghdad, and then in 1975 obtained his own license to start a gallery, the Banoosh Gallery. On October 23 of that year, he was invited to become the first artist to exhibit his own work in the Kingdom of Saudi Arabia. Other firsts for Bahraini artists followed, including exhibitions in Kuwait on February 7, 1976 (joining a circle of artists there in 1977) and the Dubai Museum in February 1978 in the United Arab Emirates. Al Oraifi exhibited in a children's collection sponsored by Japan at the Salman Cultural Center for several years, winning two silver medals in 1978 for his country. He also attended a 1979 event centered around Bosnian art in France.

In 1980, Al Oraifi participated in an exhibition commemorating the 1400th anniversary of the Hijrah, and that same year he won the Dilmun Award from the Ministry of Cabinet Affairs and Information. In 1983, he helped plan the Arab League Educational, Cultural and Scientific Organization conference in Kuwait, the General Union of Arab Artists (GUAA) exhibition in Morocco, and the Bahrain Historic Conference. The Bahrain Contemporary Art Association held its own show of his work at its studio in the Al Liwan Hall in the Sheraton in Manama on December 24, 1983, Bahrain's National Day. In 1984, he attended the GUAA conference in Baghdad and the Gulf Cooperation Council (GCC) exhibition in Kuwait. Finally, at the 1985 Biennale de Paris, he exhibited a distinctive painting of Muharraq that he later donated to the Bahrain National Museum. His folk artworks were acquired by the Information Ministry. In 1986, he was at the Baghdad Science Festival, followed in 1988 by the Baghdad International Festival of Art. In 1990, his work was featured at the International Exhibition of Freedom and Creativity in France. This was followed in 1992 by the art fair in Frankfurt, Germany.

In 1994, he founded the Rashid Al Oraifi Museum, which features his paintings and sculptures as well as photographs of him at various points in his life along with some of his many trips. Seals and ceramic frescoes and sculptures of various subjects from the ancient civilization of Dilmun, a major interest of his, are also included in the collection. Highlights in 1997 include three works he contributed to the Creative Arts Exhibition in Cairo and a special exhibit and symposium at the University of Bahrain’s Dilmun Art Gallery for the thirtieth anniversary of his first Al-Orouba show. In 1999, he was a guest host on the local arts show “Who Is Who?” Other recent shows include a GCC exhibition in Japan and Singapore, the Saddam International Exhibition in Baghdad, and the Prince Charles Competition in Monte Carlo. A founder of the National Heritage Center, he was the first artist to create field statuary in Bahrain.

Al Oraifi has held many seminars in Bahrain and elsewhere on folklore and art. Among these were ones hosted by the Arab Gulf States Folklore Centre in Qatar and others in Oman, as well as events in France and Germany. He is a member of the International Union of Artists and the GUAA. He has been involved with the Bahrain Red Crescent Society since its 1971 founding, the Bahrain History and Antiquities Association since 1973, the International Arts & Artists since 1988, and the National Committee of Museums since 1997. He joined the Board of Directors of Bahrain SC in 1973 and became Editor-in-Chief of the magazine, الدليل السياحي (“Tour Guide”), in 1978.

Death
Al Oraifi died in Bahrain Defence Force Hospital in Riffa on March 19, 2017, and was buried on the same day in Muharraq.

Study of Dilmun
One of the most prominent plastic artists in the Gulf, Al Oraifi was known for his Dilmun School of composition, inspired by the civilization in Bahrain and Iraq where Gilgamesh was said to have searched for the flower of immortality. Al Oraifi was affected greatly by seeing the Dilmun seals in high school, and painted works heavily inspired by them. His contemporaries reported that he sincerely believed himself to be an extension of this civilization, but he worked in other schools as well.

Publications
Al Oraifi has published works on Bahraini folklore and history, including the following:
 فنون بحرينية (“Art of Bahrain,” 1970)
 العمارة البحرينية (“Architecture of Bahrain,” 1978)
 الألعاب الشعبية (“Popular Games”)
 آفاق دلمونية (“Horizons of Dilmun”)
 أشياء تراثية (“Heritage Objects”)
 الأسلوب الديلموني في الفن المعاصر (“The Dilmun Style in Contemporary Art”)

Awards
Al Oraifi won many awards and certificate of appreciation over a career spanning nearly 50 years:
 Arab Historians’ Medal (1987)
 National Merit Award (1989)
 GCC Pioneer Award (1994)
 Medal of Competence, First Class, from King Hamad bin Isa Al Khalifa (2007)

References

Bahraini contemporary artists
1942 births
2017 deaths
People from Muharraq
Bahraini Sunni Muslims